The Purabi are a social group of India. Along with the Pachhimi, they make up the two branches of the Tharu caste. The cast is divided into the Barhka Purabi or "upper," and the Chhutka Purabi or "lower" eastern.

Customs
An 1880 record notes:

References

Indian castes